Alexander Austin Willis,  (30 September 1917 – 4 April 2004) was a Canadian actor and television host.

Biography

Austin was born in Halifax, Nova Scotia to parents Alexander Samuel and Emma Graham (Pushie) Willis. His older brother, J. Frank Willis, was a radio broadcaster with the Canadian Radio Broadcasting Commission (later the Canadian Broadcasting Corporation).

In 2002, Austin was made a Member of the Order of Canada. He is best known internationally for his appearance as Simmons, the man whom Auric Goldfinger beats at cards in the opening scenes of the James Bond film, Goldfinger. Originally he was to have played Felix Leiter but, at the last minute, fellow Canadian Cec Linder switched roles with him.

In Canada, he had a varied film and TV career, ranging from the early science-fiction series Space Command, to hosting Cross-Canada Hit Parade for several years in the 1950s. In the 1970s he found new fans as the host of the humorous game show This Is the Law.

Willis was married twice. His first marriage was in 1953, to Canadian actress Kate Reid, and they had two children together before divorcing in 1962. He married Gwen LaForgy in 1984, and was with her until his death, at 86, in 2004.

Filmography

 1945 Guests of Honour
 1947 Bush Pilot as "Red" North
 1948 Sins of the Fathers as Dr. Ben Edwards
 1953 Space Command as Dr. Fleming
 1955-1958 Cross-Canada Hit Parade as Host 
 1956 The Cage
 1958 A Dangerous Age as Police Officer
 1958 Wolf Dog as Clem Krivak
 1959 The Mouse That Roared as United States Secretary of Defense
 1959 Upstairs and Downstairs as McGuffey
 1959 Too Young to Love as Mr. Collins
 1960 Q.E.D. as Host
 1960 Crack in the Mirror as Hurtelaut
 1960 I Aim at the Stars as John B. Medaris
 1960 The Barbarians as Varro
 1960 The Night They Killed Joe Howe
 1961 Arch Oboler's 1+1: Exploring the Kinsey Reports as Sam Tooray, The Divorcee
 1964 Goldfinger as Mr. Simmons
 1964 Seaway (TV) as Admiral Henry Fox
 1966 Don't Forget to Wipe the Blood Off
 1967 One Hundred Years Young (TV) as Host
 1967 Eight on the Lam as Mr. Pomeroy
 1967 Hour of the Gun as Anson Safford
 1967 The Rat Patrol – Season 1, Episode 26 as Dr. Anderson
 1968 The Boston Strangler as Dr. Nagy
 1970 Frankenstein on Campus as Cantwell
 1970 The Silent Force episode "The Octopus"
 1971 Face-Off as Graydon Hunter
 1972-1976 This Is the Law as Host
 1979 C.H.O.M.P.S. as Head Engineer
 1980 The Last Flight of Noah's Ark as Slabotsky
 1982 Firefox as Walters
 1985 Kane & Abel as Senator Willis
 1986 The Boy in Blue as Bainbridge

References

External links

Order of Canada citation

1917 births
2004 deaths
Canadian male stage actors
Canadian male film actors
Canadian male television actors
Canadian television hosts
Canadian people of English descent
Members of the Order of Canada
Male actors from Halifax, Nova Scotia